The Island Packet is a daily morning broadsheet newspaper owned by Chatham Asset Management, serving primarily the residents of southern Beaufort County, South Carolina, United States, particularly the towns of Hilton Head Island and Bluffton. Its average circulation is 18,683 on weekdays and 20,260 on Sundays.

Overview

History
The newspaper was founded as a weekly on July 9, 1970, by Tom Wamsley and Ralph Hilton, with financial backing by Lucy and Jonathan Daniels, editor emeritus of the Raleigh News & Observer. Television personality Garry Moore had a regular humor column in the paper in the late 1970s and early 1980s titled "Mumble, Mumble".

Circulation
The latest circulation figures from the parent company McClatchy report circulation numbers in 2017, with circulations of 16,093 daily and 17,875 on Sundays,

See also

 List of newspapers in South Carolina

References

General
 Alliance of Audited Media

External links
 Island Packet official site
 Island Packet official mobile site
 Island Packet Facebook page
 Island Packet Twitter page
 The Island Packet Self-Service Advertising - McClatchy Ad Manager
 McClatchy Advertising - WinWithMcClatchy.com

McClatchy publications
Newspapers published in South Carolina
Beaufort County, South Carolina